Highway 35, also known as the King's Highway, is a north–south highway in Jordan.  It starts in at the Syrian border north of Irbid and leads to Highway 15 in the Ma'an Governorate.

History 
The route of Highway 35 is over 5,000 years old.  This highway was first constructed by the Romans, and was part of the Via Nova Traiana.  It is one of the most historic highways in the world (see historic King's Highway).

Tourist attractions 
This highway runs north–south from Irbid down to the Desert Highway in Ma'an Governorate. The interesting hilly highway passes the castle of Kerak and Shobak and passes Wadi Musa, the city most close to the ruins of Petra.

Roads in Jordan